The Shame is a conceptual, critical and process artwork by Abel Azcona. Developed along the West Bank Wall in 2018, in The Shame Azcona installed original fragments of the Berlin Wall along the Israeli wall in the West Bank, which forms part of the barrier built throughout Israel to separate the Palestinian lands. Azcona made a metaphorical critique by merging both walls in the work. The actual installation, as if it were a piece of land art, currently remains along the wall, and has been exhibited in different countries through photographic and video art. The Israeli government has prohibited the artist from entering Israel because of the piece.

Bibliography

See also 

 Wall of Shame
 List of Berlin Wall segments
 Performance Art
 Installation
 Endurance art
 Israeli–Palestinian conflict

References

Performances